The 2003 Denver mayoral election was held on May 6 and June 3, 2003.

Candidates
Susan Casey, City Councilmember
John Hickenlooper
Donald J. Mares, City Auditor
Phil Perington
Elizabeth Schlosser
Penfield Tate III, State Senator
Aristedes 'Ari' Zavaras

Polling

Results

Notes

References

Denver
2003
Mayoral elections in Denver
2003 Colorado elections
John Hickenlooper